This is a list of international presidential trips made by Petr Pavel, the fourth President of the Czech Republic, since his inauguration on 9 March 2023.

Since March 2023, he has visited these countries:

 1 visit: Slovakia
 1 visit: Poland

List

2023

References 

Pavel
Pavel
Petr Pavel
2023 beginnings